GM Inside News (abbreviated GMI) is an Internet Forum focused on General Motors, its brands and products.

While truly "inside" news is rare on this site, when GMI does get a "scoop" bigger and more established publications have been known to use the popular site as a source. As of recent GMI shows info from all car makers, not just General Motors.

As of February 2012, GM Inside News has over 55,000 members and 2,000,000 posts.

History

2008 - present: Autoforums era
In March 2008, GMI was transferred to the ownership of AutoForums.com and given another major redesign.

In January 2009, GMI was given a slight update to the forums and started becoming more of a global site.

In July 2009, GMI was updated again. The update added a new "Premium Membership" option, through which a user can pay to help support the site in exchange for a badge under their username and some extra forum features.

References

External links

Internet forums
Internet properties established in 2001